Alexandre Dib (3 September 1929 – 6 April 2012) was a Brazilian boxer. He competed in the men's welterweight event at the 1952 Summer Olympics. In the opening round, he lost to Victor Jörgensen of Denmark.

References

External links

1929 births
2012 deaths
Brazilian male boxers
Olympic boxers of Brazil
Boxers at the 1952 Summer Olympics
Place of birth missing
Welterweight boxers